The 1970–71 Valparaiso Crusaders men's basketball team represented Valparaiso University during the 1970–71 NCAA Division II men's basketball season.

Roster

Schedule

References 

Valparaiso Beacons men's basketball seasons
Valparaiso Crusaders men's basketball
Valparaiso Crusaders men's basketball